Greatest Hits Volume III: I'm a Survivor is the third greatest hits compilation released by Reba McEntire.  Released in 2001, it featured 12 of her hits from the 1990s plus three new songs.  The lead single, "I'm a Survivor", peaked at number 4 on the Hot Country Songs charts which is also the theme song for her former TV show Reba. It was followed by a cover of Kenny Rogers' 1977 single "Sweet Music Man", which McEntire took to number 36 on the country music charts.

The album debuted at number 1 on the Billboard Country Albums chart and #19 on the Billboard 200 for the week of November 10, 2001 selling 147,000 copies in its first week of release. It stayed in the Top Ten for 8 weeks.

Track listing

Personnel
 Barry Bales – bass guitar
 Ron Block – acoustic guitar
 Jerry Douglas – dobro
 Steve Gibson – electric guitar
 Jim Keltnor – drums
 Alison Krauss – background vocals
 Paul Leim – drums
 Reba McEntire – lead vocals
 Steve Nathan – keyboards
 Kim Parent – background vocals
 Michael Rhodes – bass guitar
 Matt Rollings – keyboards
 Gary Smith – piano
 Russell Terrell – background vocals
 Chris Thile – bouzouki

Charts

Weekly charts

Year-end charts

Certifications and sales

Singles
Billboard (North America)

References

2001 compilation albums
Reba McEntire compilation albums
MCA Records compilation albums
Albums produced by Tony Brown (record producer)